von Luettwitz can refer to either: 

Heinrich Freiherr von Lüttwitz
Smilo Freiherr von Lüttwitz
Walther von Lüttwitz